In beekeeping, a queen clip is a small spring-loaded metal or plastic clamshell-shaped clip designed to pick up or contain a queen bee. It has slits in its sides that worker bees can pass through to attend to the queen's needs or to receive queen substance, but the queen bee cannot pass through. 

When empty, it can be clipped onto some convenient place, such as the edge of the beekeeper's lapel. 

The queen clip is completely different to the queen mailing/introduction cage which, 
as the name implies, is employed by queen breeders to mail each single queen to their customer. 
The customer then uses it to introduce the queen into a hive. The mailing cage has room for the queen 
and a few escort nurse bees, and some candied honey covering the exit. The hive's worker bees consume 
the candied honey over a period of a few days to release the queen.

References

Beekeeping tools